Linn Grove may refer to a place in the United States:

Linn Grove, Indiana
Linn Grove, Iowa